Tisdale may refer to:

People
Ashley Tisdale (born 1985), American entertainer
David Tisdale (1835–1911), Canadian politician
Jennifer Tisdale (born 1981), American actress, model and older sister of Ashley
Mahlon Tisdale (1890–1972), a United States Navy admiral during World War II
Margaret Tisdale (died 2015), British virologist
Paul Tisdale (born 1973), British football manager
Ryland Dillard Tisdale (1894–1942), a United States Navy Commander during both World Wars
Wayman Tisdale (1964–2009), American basketball player and jazz bass guitarist

Places

Canada

Rural Municipality of Tisdale No. 427, Saskatchewan
Tisdale, Saskatchewan
Tisdale Airport

United States
Tisdale, Kansas
Tisdale Township, Cowley County, Kansas
Wesley D. Tisdale Elementary School, Ramsey, New Jersey

Vessels
, the name of more than one United States Navy ship
, a United States Navy guided-missile frigate in commission from 1982 to 1996

See also
Tisdall, a surname
Tisdel, a surname